The Aire River is a perennial river of the Corangamite catchment, located in the Otways region of the Australian state of Victoria.

Location and features

The river generally flows west by south then south through the Great Otway National Park, joined by three minor tributaries, before reaching its mouth and emptying into Bass Strait west of Cape Otway.
 
The river is traversed by the Great Ocean Road and the Great Ocean Walk near the river's mouth.

It was named by the surveyor George Smythe after the River Aire in Yorkshire, England.

See also

 List of rivers of Victoria

References

External links

Corangamite catchment
Rivers of Barwon South West (region)
Otway Ranges